Each Time I Kill is the final film that was written and directed by Doris Wishman. It was shot in 2002 shortly before Wishman's death from lymphoma, and post-production on the teen horror thriller was completed in October 2006. Tiffany Paralta stars as Ellie Saunders, a shy high school senior who finds a magical locket which will allow her to exchange one physical feature with anyone she murders.

The director of photography was longtime Wishman collaborator C. Davis Smith, and cameo appearances were made by The B-52's frontman Fred Schneider and scream queen Linnea Quigley.

Each Time I Kill received its world premiere on March 30, 2007, at the New York Underground Film Festival and was also selected by the Philadelphia International Gay & Lesbian Film Festival.

References

External links
 

2007 films
2007 horror films
2000s English-language films
Films directed by Doris Wishman
2000s American films